Zawisty-Kruki  is a village in the administrative district of Gmina Boguty-Pianki, within Ostrów Mazowiecka County, Masovian Voivodeship, in east-central Poland. The nearest airport is WAW - Warsaw Okecie, located 120.1 km south west of Zawisty Kruki.

References

Zawisty-Kruki